Row is an album by the Colorado band Gerard, fronted by singer/songwriter Gerard McMahon. It was Gerard's second album and was released in 1976.

Track listing
All songs written and produced by Gerard McMahon. 
"I Don't Belong Here Now" 
"My Family " 
"Take Me to the Sky" 
"Neil's Song" 
"Once More and Again" 
"I Was Born Alone" 
"Time Is Short" 
"How Easy We Let Go" 
"Simple Me, Simple You"

Personnel
Gerard McMahon	— composer, arranger, producer, vocals, piano,  
Kenny Mazur — guitar
John Palermo — engineer
Kim Plainfield	— drums
Steve Skinner — synthesizer
Roger Squitero	— percussion
Lincoln Goines	— guitar (bass)
Zev Katz — guitar (bass)

External links
www.artistdirect.com
[ www.allmusic.com]

1976 albums
Gerard McMahon albums